Rush is both an English surname and given name.

People with the surname 
Andy Rush (1889–1969), American baseball pitcher
Annaleah Rush (born 1976), New Zealand rugby union player
Anthony Rush (born 1996), American football player
Augustus John Rush (born 1942), American psychiatrist
Barbara Rush (born 1927), American actress
Benjamin Rush  (1745–1813), a Founding Father of the United States, physician, writer, educator and humanitarian
Bobby Rush (born 1946), U.S. Representative from Illinois
Bobby Rush (musician) (born 1940), American blues and R&B musician, composer and singer
Bob Rush (American football) (born 1955), American football player
Bob Rush (Australian footballer) (1880–1975), Australian rules footballer and administrator
Bob Rush (baseball) (1925–2011), American baseball pitcher
Boyd Rush (1895–1964), first heart transplant recipient
Brandon Rush (born 1985), American basketball player
Brion Rush (born 1984), American basketball player
Bryan Rush (1893–1982), Australian rules footballer
Caroline Rush, Chief Executive of the British Fashion Council
Cathy Rush (born 1947), American basketball coach
Charles W. Rush (1919–2015), United States Navy captain
Chris Rush (born 1946), American comedian
Christopher Rush (1965–2016), American illustrator 
Clay Rush (born 1973), former American football kicker
Clive Rush (1931–1980), American football player
Cooper Rush (born 1993), American football quarterback
DJ Rush (born 1970), American musician, disc jockey, and record producer
Dan Rush (born 1960), American union organizer
Darius Rush (born 2000), American football player
David Rush (disambiguation), multiple people
Debbie Rush (born 1966), English actress
Deborah Rush (born 1954), American actress
Dick Rush (1884–?), Austrian-born American character actor
Don Rush, American director, script writer, voice actor and producer
Ed T. Rush (active 1966–2003), American basketball referee
Eddie Rush (born 1961), American basketball referee
Edward Rush (cricketer), Australian cricketer
Edward Rush (priest), Irish Anglican priest
Elaine Rush, New Zealand professor of nutrition
Emma Rush, lecturer in philosophy and ethics
Eric Rush (born 1965), New Zealand rugby union footballer
Fanny Rush, London-based portrait painter
Florence Rush (1918–2008), American feminist organizer
Francis Roberts Rush (1916–2001), Roman Catholic Archbishop of Brisbane
Francis Rush (1921–1985), American politician
Geoffrey Rush (born 1951), Australian actor and film producer
Gerald Rush (1895–1988), Australian rules footballer
Ian Rush (born 1961), Welsh former footballer and football manager
JaRon Rush (born 1979), American basketball player
Jennifer Rush (born 1960), American pop rock singer and songwriter
Joseph H. Rush (1911–2006), American physicist
Kareem Rush (born 1980), American basketball player
Ken Rush (1931–2011), American racing driver
Lyndon Rush (born 1980), Canadian bobsledder
Matthew Rush (footballer) (born 1971), English footballer
Merrilee Rush (born 1944), American singer 
Otis Rush (1934–2018), American blues singer and guitarist
Red Rush (1927–2009), American sportscaster
Richard Rush (1780–1859), United States Attorney General and Secretary of the Treasury
Richard Rush (director) (1929–2021), American film director
Tom Rush (born 1941), American singer
William R. Rush (1857–1940), United States Navy officer
William Rush (sculptor) (1756–1833), American sculptor
Xavier Rush (born 1977), New Zealand former rugby union footballer

People with the given name 
 Rush Brown (born 1954), American football defensive lineman
 Rush Clark (1834–1879), 19th-century American politician and lawyer
 Rush Holt Sr. (1905–1955), U.S. Senator from West Virginia
 Rush Holt Jr. (born 1948), U.S. Representative from New Jersey
 Rush Kalaria (born 1993), Indian cricketer
 Rush Limbaugh Sr. (1891–1996), American attorney and civic leader in Missouri
 Rush Limbaugh (1951–2021), American talk show host, grandson of the above
 Rush Propst (born 1957), American high school football coach
 Rush Rhees (1905–1989), American philosopher
 Rush Sturges (born 1985), American whitewater kayaker, filmmaker and musician
 Rush Wimberly (1873–1943), American politician

See also 
 Rush § People, Rush as a stage name or mononym

English-language surnames